ATAG may refer to:
Air Transport Action Group
Authoring Tools Accessibility Guidelines (ATAG), a part of the Web Accessibility Initiative (WAI)